Yanajaja (possibly from Quechua yana black, qaqa rock, "black rock") is a  mountain in the west of the Chila mountain range in the Andes of Peru. It is located in the Arequipa Region, Castilla Province, Chachas District. Yanajaja lies southwest of Cerani at a lake named Cochapunco.

References

Mountains of Peru
Mountains of Arequipa Region